World Soul is a science fiction novel written by Mikhail Yemtsev and Yeremey Parnov.

References

External links 
 World Soul at Library of Congress
 

Soviet science fiction novels
1964 novels